Ilques Barbosa Junior (born 29 May 1954 in Ribeirão Preto) is a Brazilian Admiral of the Fleet, former Chief of General Staff and Commander of the Navy from January 2019 to March 2021.

He is married to Leoniza Neves de Aguiar e Sousa Barbosa and has two daughter: Larissa and Christina.

Career
Admiral Ilques has a long career in the Brazilian Navy. He was Midshipman, 2nd Lieutenant, 1st Lieutenant, Captain Lieutenant, Corvette Captain, Frigate Captain, Captain of Sea and War, Counter Admiral, Vice Admiral and Admiral of the Fleet.

He was admitted at Naval School and had classes of Improvement of Communication for Officials, Basic Classes, Command and Staff, Superior Classes, Regular Classes of Staff in Academy of Naval War - Chile Army, Maritime Politics and Strategies Classes, High Studies of Politics and Strategies in Superior School of War.

Military awards
  Order of Defence Merit (Grand Cross)
  Order of Naval Merit (Grand Cross)
  Order of Military Merit (Grand Officer)
  Order of Aeronautical Merit (Grand Officer)
  Order of Rio Branco (Grand Cross)
  Order of Military Judiciary Merit (Grand Officer)

References

1954 births
Living people
People from Ribeirão Preto
Brazilian admirals